Joshua Sheng is an American chess grandmaster.

Chess career
In 2018, Sheng was ranked as the #1 junior in Southern California. In August 2019, his Elo rating briefly surpassed 2500, satisfying the minimum rating requirement for the Grandmaster title.

In October 2021, he earned his final norm at the Vezerkepzo tournament  in Budapest. His Grandmaster title was finalized later that year.

Sheng co-authored the book Mastering Chess Logic with Guannan "Terry" Song, a Canadian FIDE Master.

In August 2022, he was defeated by IM Semen Khanin in the 122nd Annual U. S. Open Chess Championship in Rancho Mirage, California.

Personal life
Sheng graduated from the University of California, Berkeley in 2021 with a bachelors in environmental earth science and a minor in food science.

References

Living people
2000 births
American chess players
Chess grandmasters
Sportspeople from Santa Monica, California